Thomas Hoyt Davis (July 4, 1892 – May 19, 1969) was a United States district judge of the United States District Court for the Middle District of Georgia.

Education and career

Born in Braselton, Georgia, Davis received an Artium Baccalaureus degree from Mercer University in 1913 and read law to enter the bar in 1916. He was in private practice in Georgia from 1916 to 1926. He was a state solicitor general of the Cordele Judicial Circuit in Georgia from 1927 to 1933. He was the United States Attorney for the Middle District of Georgia from 1933 to 1945.

Federal judicial service

On January 3, 1945, Davis was nominated by President Franklin D. Roosevelt to a seat on the United States District Court for the Middle District of Georgia vacated by Judge Bascom Sine Deaver. Davis was confirmed by the United States Senate on January 29, 1945, and received his commission on January 30, 1945. He served as Chief Judge from 1949 to 1961, assuming senior status on June 30, 1961, and serving in that capacity until his death on May 19, 1969. Judge Davis was buried in the Vienna City Cemetery in Vienna, Georgia.

References

Sources
 

1892 births
1969 deaths
Judges of the United States District Court for the Middle District of Georgia
United States district court judges appointed by Franklin D. Roosevelt
20th-century American judges
United States federal judges admitted to the practice of law by reading law